Centro Coyoacán, also known as Centro Comercial Coyoacán, was a shopping mall located on Av. Coyoacán and Av. Universidad in Mexico City, Mexico.

The mall was closed on 19 September 2022 and the area will be incorporated into the adjacent Mítikah mixed-used complex, which includes a shopping center and the largest skyscraper in Mexico City. Mítikah shopping center is to open in late 2022 including a new Palacio de Hierro department store, replacing the Centro Coyoacán location.

Background

Renowned architect Javier Sordo Madaleno was appointed to design a unique space to house exclusive stores and an El Palacio de Hierro department store. In 1989, El Palacio de Hierro opened Centro Coyoacán, its first shopping mall.

See also

 Galerías Insurgentes

References

External links
 Centro Coyoacán 
 El Palacio de Hierro 

Shopping malls in Greater Mexico City
Shopping malls established in 1989
Defunct shopping malls
Shopping malls disestablished in 2022
Buildings and structures in Mexico City
Tourist attractions in Mexico City
1989 establishments in Mexico
2022 disestablishments in Mexico